Streptothamnus is a genus of flowering plants in the family Berberidopsidaceae. It has only one currently accepted species, Streptothamnus moorei, native to northern New South Wales and southeast Queensland, Australia. It is a scandent shrub found in forested montane areas.

References

Monotypic eudicot genera
Berberidopsidales
Taxa named by Ferdinand von Mueller